The Community of Madrid Orchestra, founded in 1987, is a symphony orchestra in Madrid, Spain. It is the resident orchestra at the Teatro de la Zarzuela in Madrid and performs its concert programs at the Auditorio Nacional de Música.

The current principal conductor is José Ramón Encinar and the first concertmaster is Víctor Arriola.

History
Founded in 1987, the Community of Madrid Orchestra is the official orchestra of the Community of Madrid. The activity of the Orchestra changed radically in 1998, when it became the tenured orchestra of the Teatro de la Zarzuela and alternated its appearances between the pit and the stage.

See also 
 Madrid Symphony Orchestra
 Spanish National Orchestra
 Queen Sofía Chamber Orchestra
 RTVE Symphony Orchestra
 Teatro Real
 National Auditorium of Music
 Teatro Monumental
 Joven Orquesta Nacional de España
 Zarzuela

References

External links
 Official web site

Spanish orchestras
Culture in Madrid
Musical groups established in 1987
1987 establishments in Spain